Henri Charr, also credited as H. Charr, is an Assyrian filmmaker born in Iran and living in Southern California. He started in educational films and documentaries, then turned to mainstream cinema in genres including thrillers, drams, action-adventure, family films and comedies.

In the early 1990s Charr made a trilogy of action films: Under Lock and Key, Caged Hearts and Cell Block Sisters. In the mid-1990s Char made family films; My Uncle: The Alien was a Selection at the Brussels International Festival of Fantasy, Thriller and Science Fiction Films. He then made Little Heroes,  a children's film televised on Animal Planet as the "Movie of the Month". In 2002 Charr produced and directed the Action-Adventure Disaster film Wildfire.

He then produced family adventure comedy Abe & Bruno, suspense drama Heart of Fear, and Stepping High.

Director, filmography
Please Don't Eat the Babies (1983), aka Island Fury (USA: video title)
Fatal Encounter (1990)
Illegal Entry: Formula for Fear (1993)
Under Lock and Key (1995)
Cellblock Sisters: Banished Behind Bars (1995), aka Banished Behind Bars
Caged Hearts (1995)
Wild Fire (1995)
My Uncle the Alien (1996)
Hollywood Safari (1997)
Little Heroes (film) (1999)
Little Heroes 2 (2000)
Little Heroes 3 (2002), aka Les Petits héros III (Canada: French title: TV title), aka Top Dogs: Little Heroes 3 (UK)
Abe & Bruno (2006) (TV)
Heart of Fear (2006)
Forbidden Border (2009)
I Love Your Moves (2012)
The Big Goofy Secret of Hidden Pines (2013)
Stepping High (2013)

Writer, filmography
Illegal Entry: Formula for Fear (1993) (story)
Under Lock and Key (1995) (story)
Cellblock Sisters: Banished Behind Bars (1995) (story), aka Banished Behind Bars
Caged Hearts (1995) (story)
My Uncle the Alien (1996) (story)
Little Heroes 3 (2002) (story) Les Petits héros III (Canada: French title: TV title), aka Top Dogs: Little Heroes 3 (UK)
Wild Fire (film) (2003)
Abe & Bruno (2006) (TV)
Heart of Fear (2006) (story)

Producer, filmography
Illegal Entry: Formula for Fear (1993) (executive producer)
Caged Hearts (1995) (executive producer)
Under Lock and Key (1995) (executive producer)
Hollywood Safari (2001) TV Series (executive producer)
Heart of Fear (2006) (producer)

Production manager, filmography
3 Little Ninjas and the Lost Treasure (1990) (post-production supervisor), aka Little Ninjas (USA: video title)

Sound department, filmography
Savage Harbor (1987) (sound effects editor) (credited as H. Charr), aka Death Feud (USA: new title), aka Raggedy Anne, aka Slammers (USA)

See also
 List of Assyrians

References

External links

 

Assyrian film directors
Chaldean Catholics
Iranian film directors
Iranian emigrants to the United States
Iranian Eastern Catholics
Year of birth missing (living people)
Living people
Iranian Assyrian people